Events in the year 1839 in Belgium.

Incumbents
Monarch: Leopold I
Prime Minister: Barthélémy de Theux de Meylandt

Events
19 April – Treaty of London guarantees Belgian independence and neutrality; Luxembourg and Limburg partitioned.
21 May – Royal Library of Belgium opens to the public.
11 June – Parliamentary elections

Publications
 Maetschappy der Vlaemsche Bibliophilen founded by Constant-Philippe Serrure and Philip Blommaert as a text publication society to produce editions of medieval Flemish literature.

Periodicals
Bibliographie de la Belgique, ou catalogue général de livres belges (Brussels, C. Muquardt)
Revue de Bruxelles, 3.

Official publications
Machines à vapeur: Arrêtés et instructions (Brussels, Librairie Polytechnique)

Other works
 Kronyk van Vlaenderen van 580 tot 1467 (2 vols, Ghent, Maetschappy der Vlaemsche Bibliophilen).
 Le promeneur dans Bruxelles et dans ses environs (Brussels, Société Typographique Belge)
 Mrs. Wemyss Dalrymple, The Economist's New Brussels Guide (Brussels, W. Todd)
Louis de Potter, Révolution belge, 1828 à 1839: Souvenirs personnels (Brussels, Meline, Cans & co.)
Joseph Jean De Smet, Abrégé de l'histoire de la Belgique, third edition (Ghent)
 Pierre Simons and Gustave Nicolas Joseph de Ridder, Le Chemin de fer belge, ou recueil des mémoires et devis pour l'établissement du chemin de fer d'Anvers et Ostende à Cologne, avec embranchement de Bruxelles et de Gand aux frontières de France, 3rd edition (Brussels, Lacross et Cie.)
 Auguste Voisin, La bataille de Woeringen: récit historique (Brussels, Société des Beaux-Arts)

Art and architecture

 Antoine Wiertz, Esmeralda, Quasimodo

Births
10 February – Max Rooses, writer and museum curator (died 1914)
1 March – Élie Marchal, botanist (died 1923)
28 July – Isabelle Gatti de Gamond, feminist educator (died 1905)
7 August – Charles Hermans, painter (died 1924)
30 August – Henri Maquet, architect (died 1909)
18 October – Alphonse Joseph Charles Dubois, naturalist (died 1921)
18 December – Adolf Daens, radical priest (died 1907)
26 December – Charles John Seghers, missionary bishop (died 1886)

Deaths
9 June – Joseph Paelinck (born 1781), painter
7 August – Erasme Louis Surlet de Chokier (born 1769), politician
15 December – Mattheus Ignatius van Bree (born 1773), painter

References

 
1830s in Belgium